The following is a timeline of the history of the city of Hamburg, Germany.

Prior to 16th century

 831 – Bishopric established.
 845 – Town sacked by Norsemen.
 1189
 Adolf III of Holstein gets charter from Holy Roman Emperor Frederick I that gives Hamburg a court, jurisdiction, and fishing rights.
 St. Peter's Church built (approximate date).
 1190 – Alster dam installed.
 1201 – Hamburg occupied by forces of Valdemar II of Denmark.
 1223 – Archbishopric relocated from Hamburg to Bremen.
 1241 – Lübeck-Hamburg alliance established.
 1248 – Fire.
 1256 – St. Catherine's Church active (approximate date).
 1284 – 5 August: Fire.
 1286 – 24 April: acquires rights to maintain permanent fire on Neuwerk.
 1299 – 1 November: allowed to build a fortified tower, the new work (Neuwerk).
 1310 – completion of the Great Tower Neuwerk.
 1329 – St. Mary's Cathedral consecrated.
 1350 – Black Death.
 1356 –  (feast) begins.
 1375 – Grocers' Guild formed.
 1390 – Public clock installed (approximate date).
 1410 – Constitution of Hamburg established.
 1412 – .
 1418 – St. Peter's Church rebuilt (approximate date).
 1479 –  (public library) established in the Town Hall.
 1491 – Printing press in operation.
 1500 – City expands its borders.

16th–18th centuries

 1510 – Hamburg becomes an imperial city of the Holy Roman Empire.
 1529
 Protestant Reformation.
 Council of citizens established.
 Johanneum (college) founded.
 1536 – Hamburg joins Schmalkaldic League.
 1558 – Hamburg Stock Exchange established.
 1567 – Trade with the Company of Merchant Adventurers of London established.
 1590 – Berenberg Bank founded.
 1615 – City walls extended around Hamburg-Neustadt.
 1619 –  founded.
 1630 – Bremen–Lübeck–Hamburg defensive alliance formed.
 1654 –  in use.
 1663 – Erbauliche Monaths Unterredungen magazine begins publication.
 1665 – Hamburg Chamber of Commerce founded.
 1669
 St. Michael's Church built.
  (ship) launched.
 1678 – Oper am Gänsemarkt (opera house) opens; premiere of Theile's opera Adam und Eva.
 1679 – Coffee house in business.
 1705 – Premiere of Handel's opera Almira.
 1710 –  established.
 1712 – Plague.
 1735 –  (business library) founded.
 1762
 City occupied by Danish forces.
 St. Michael's Church built.
 1765
  (arts society) and Patriotic Club founded.
 Komödienhaus (theatre) built.
 1767 – Hamburgische Entreprise (theatre) established.
 1778 – Hamburger Ersparungskasse (bank) established.
 1787 – City directory published.
 1789 – Clubbs der Freundschaft founded.
 1790 – United States consulate established.
 1792 –  formed.
 1799 – H. J. Merck & Co. in business.

19th century

1800s–1840s
 1805 –  (education society) founded.
 1806 – 19 November: French occupation of city begins.
 1810 – Hoffmann und Campe publisher in business.
 1811 – City becomes capital of the French Bouches-de-l'Elbe department.
 1813
 Siege of Hamburg.
 Hamburg Women's Association established.
 1814 – Hamburg Citizen Militia and Hamburg Police formed.
 1815 – 8 June: City becomes a member state of the German Confederation.
 1821 – Lehmann's botanical garden established.
 1823 
Hospital built in St. George.
Altona Observatory founded by Heinrich Christian Schumacher.
 1825 – February flood of 1825.
 1827 – City Theatre opens.
 1828 – Hamburg Philharmonic Society formed.
 1833 – Rauhes Haus founded.
 1834 – Johanneum building constructed.
 1835 – Coat of arms of Hamburg redesigned.
 1838 – English Church built.
 1839 – Verein für Hamburgische Geschichte (local history society) founded.
 1840
 Gymnasium founded.
 Population: 136,956.
 1841 – Circus Gymnasticus opens.
 1842
 Exchange built.
 5–8 May: Great Fire of Hamburg.
 1843
 Thalía Theatre built.
  established.
 1845 –  shopping arcade built.
 1846 – Berliner Railway Station established.
 1847
 Hamburg America Line in business.
 Patriotic Club building constructed.
 Pestalozzi-Stiftung Hamburg founded
 1848 –  in business.
 1849
  newspaper begins publication.
 St. Peter's Church rebuilt again.

1850s–1890s
 1850 – Kunsthalle (art gallery) opens.
 1855 – January: Flood.
 1856 – North German Bank and Union Bank established.
 1859
  built.
 Hamburg Frauenchor (women's choir) founded.
 1861
 Museum Godeffroy opens.
 Population: 178,841.
 1863
  newspaper in publication.
 Zoological Garden of Hamburg opens.
 Rebuilt St. Nicholas' Church dedicated.
 1865
 Lübeck–Hamburg railway begins operating; Lübecker Railway Station established.
  (bridge) built.
 1866
 Horsecar tram begins operating.
  (railway station) established.
 21 August: City becomes part of the North German Confederation.
 1867 – Trabrennbahn Bahrenfeld (horse racetrack) built.
 1868 – St. Georg becomes part of city.
 1869 – Horner Rennbahn (horse racetrack) and Kunsthalle built.
 1871
 City becomes part of the German Empire.
 Population: 240,251.
  (education society) branch established.
 1872 – Venloer Railway Station established.
 1873
 Photographic Society founded.
 Frei Hafen bridge constructed.
 1874 – Hagenbeck's zoo opens.
 1877
 Ohlsdorf Cemetery established near city.
 Blohm + Voss shipbuilders in business near city.
 1878 – Museum for Art and Industry founded.
 1879
  headquartered in Hamburg.
 Holsten Brewery in business.
 1880 – Steinway & Sons piano factory in operation.
 1883 – Speicherstadt (warehouse district) construction begins in the Port of Hamburg.
 1887
  newspaper begins publication.
 Sport-Club Germania Hamburg founded.
 Central post office built.
 1888
 Hamburg joins German Customs Union.
 Harbourworks and iron bridge constructed.
 Free Port opens.
 1889 – 15 May: Exhibition of Trade and Industry opens.
 1890
 German East Africa Line (shipping company) in business.
 May: Gas-worker strike.
 Population: 323,923.
 1891 – Natural History Museum built.
 1892
 .
 German Open Tennis Championships begin.
 Hamburger Dom (funfair) relocated to Heiligengeistfeld fair ground.
 1894 – St. Pauli becomes part of city.
 1896
 November: Dockworker strike.
  (fish market) rebuilt.
 1897 – Hamburg Rathaus (city hall) built.
 1898 – Hamburg-Altona railway station opens.
 1899 –  (library) founded.
 1900
 Institute for Maritime and Tropical Diseases opens.
 Shipbuilding school founded.

20th century

1900–1945

 1901 – Civil law courts built.
 1904 – American Businessmen's Club of Hamburg founded.
 1905 – Population: 802,793.
 1906
 Hamburg Hauptbahnhof (railway station) opens.
 Altona-Hamburg railway begins operating.
 1907
 Tierpark Hagenbeck (zoo) established.
 Stadion Hoheluft (stadium) opens.
 1908
  established.
 Music Hall inaugurated.
 Simplo Fullfeder pen company relocates to Hamburg.
 1909 – Hotel Atlantic in business.
 1910 – Sportplatz at Rothenbaum opens.
 1911 – Hamburg Airport and Elbe Tunnel open.
 1912
 Hamburg U-Bahn begins operating.
 Hamburg-Bergedorf Observatory dedicated.
 Hamburg-Mannheimer Insurance Corporation in business.
 1913
 3 April: Vaterland passenger ship launched.
 Gewerkschaftlich-Genossenschaftliche Versicherungsaktiengesellschaft (insurance firm) in business.
 1914 – Hamburg Stadtpark (park) opens.
 1918
 Hamburg Kammerspiele (theatre) founded.
 Hamburger Volkszeitung newspaper begins publication.
 1919 – University of Hamburg and Hamburger Sport-Verein established.
 1922 – Museum of Hamburg History opens.
 1923 – Labour and Socialist International founded in Hamburg.
 1924
 Nordische Rundfunk radio begins broadcasting.
 Chilehaus built.
 1925
 Helms-Museum and Hamburg School of Astrology established.
 Population: 1,079,126.
 1926 – Botanischer Sondergarten Wandsbek (garden) established.
 1930
 Planten un Blomen (park) created.
 Population: 1,145,124.
 1933
 Nazis seize control of the city and Carl Vincent Krogmann becomes mayor.
 Hamburger Flugzeugbau (aircraft company) in business.
 1934
 Bürgerschaft abolished.
 Gau Hamburg established.
 Transmitter Hamburg-Billstedt begins operating.
 1937
 major expansion of the land of Hamburg per the Greater Hamburg Act:
 the cities Altona, Wandsbek, and Harburg-Wilhelmsburg join 
 and the cities Geesthacht and Cuxhaven (including Neuwerk) leave the territory of the Land Hamburg.
 1938 – Neuengamme concentration camp established by SS.
 1939 – Bombing of Hamburg in World War II begins.
 1945
 Bombing of Hamburg in World War II ends.
 Hamburg in the British occupation zone. 
 Rudolf Petersen appointed mayor by British authorities.
 Eppendorf (company) founded.
 Population: 1,350,278.

1946–1990s

 1946
 Max Brauer becomes mayor.
 1948
 Hamburger Abendblatt newspaper and Stern news magazine begin publication.
 Population: 1,518,900.
 1949 – Hamburger Morgenpost newspaper begins publication.
 1950 – Public University of Music established.
 1951 – Institut français Hamburg founded.
 1952
 Der Spiegel news magazine headquartered in city.
 Bild newspaper begins publication.
 Constitution of Hamburg ratified.
 UNESCO Institute for Lifelong Learning headquartered in city.
 1953
 Volksparkstadion (stadium) opens.
 International garden show held.
 1955 – Hamburg State Opera building opens.
 1957
 Fazle Omar Mosque built.
 Streit's Haus Filmtheater opens.
 British Army School and Hamburg Symphony Orchestra established.
 1958 – Hamburg Atlantic Line in business.
 1959 – Kaiserkeller night club opens.
 1960 – August: English rock band The Beatles begin performing in Hamburg.
 1961 – Population: 1,840,543.
 1962
 Spiegel scandal.
 North Sea flood of 1962.
 1963
 Millerntor-Stadion (stadium) opens.
 St. James' Church restored.
 Alter Botanischer Garten Hamburg greenhouses built.
 1964 - Deutsches Übersee-Institut headquartered in Hamburg.
 1965
 Gruner + Jahr publisher in business.
 Hamburg Transport Association established.
 Imam Ali Mosque built.
 NDR Fernsehen (television) headquartered in city.
 1967 – Eros Center brothel in business on the Reeperbahn.
 1968
 Cherry Blossom Festival begins.
 Alsterdorfer Sporthalle and Gruenspan music club open.
 1969 – waived older rights on harbour estate in Cuxhaven in favour of Neuwerk and Scharhörn to build an offshore harbour.
 1970
 Hamburg University of Applied Sciences founded.
 Population: 1,793,640.
 1971 –  and Fabrik cultural centre founded.
 1973
 Congress Center Hamburg opens.
 University of the German Federal Armed Forces and Neumeier's Hamburg Ballet established.
  (bridge) built.
 1974
 Köhlbrand Bridge built.
 Hans-Ulrich Klose becomes mayor.
 1975 – New Elbe Tunnel opens.
 1976 – Die Motte youth centre founded in Ottensen.
 1978 – Technical University of Hamburg founded.
 1979
 Botanischer Garten Hamburg (garden) opens.
 Werkstatt 3 co-operative founded in Ottensen.
 1980 – Stadtteilarchiv Ottensen (archive) founded.
 1981
 Protest against proposed Brokdorf Nuclear Power Plant.
 Klaus von Dohnányi becomes mayor.
 Squat on Hafenstraße begins.
 1982 – Kampnagel (cultural space) established.
 1984
 Chaos Communication Congress begins.
 Hamburg Institute for Social Research founded.
 1985
 Birdland jazz club opens.
 Museum der Arbeit established.
 1986
 Chaos Computer Club headquartered in city.
 Radio Hamburg begins broadcasting.
 Hamburg Marathon begins.
 Brokdorf Nuclear Power Plant commissioned near city.
 1988
 Center for Science and International Security at the University of Hamburg founded.
 Henning Voscherau becomes mayor.
 Population: 1,603,070.
 1989
 Deichtorhallen art centre opens.
  founded.
 1990 –  headquartered in city.
 1992 – Filmfest Hamburg begins.
 1994 – Film and Television Museum Hamburg and Roman Catholic Archdiocese of Hamburg established.
 1996 – City website online (approximate date).
 1997 – Ortwin Runde becomes mayor.
 1998
 Afghan Museum established.
 Am Rothenbaum (sport venue) built.
 2000
 Bucerius Law School established.
 International Tribunal for the Law of the Sea headquartered in city.

21st century

 2001
 Long Night of Museums begins.
 Container Terminal Altenwerder opens.
 Ole von Beust becomes mayor.
 2002
 4 November: Bambule eviction.
 O2 World arena opens.
 Bucerius Kunst Forum (art gallery) founded.
 2003 – Hamburg Pride founded.
 2004
 Hamburg Summit: China meets Europe begins.
 Major Records in business.
 2005 – eVendi Arena (for American Football) built.
 2006 – German Institute of Global and Area Studies established.
 2007
 World Future Council and  headquartered in city.
 29 May: Anti-globalization protest.
 Dockville music festival. 
 Elbphilharmonie construction begins.
 2008
 HafenCity district and  established.
  (industrial public relations event) begins.
 Museum für Kunst und Kultur an der Elbe opens in Jenisch House.
 2009
 International Chamber Music Competition Hamburg begins.
 Student protest for education reform.
 2010 – Christoph Ahlhaus becomes mayor.
 2011
 Olaf Scholz becomes mayor.
 European Union, Latin America and the Caribbean Foundation headquartered in city.
 2012 – Population: 1,813,587.
 2013 – December: 2013–14 Hamburg demonstrations begin.
 2016 – 31 October: Elbphilharmonie concert hall is officially completed.
 2017 – 7 July: G20 summit meeting held.

See also
 History of Hamburg
 List of mayors of Hamburg
 List of museums and cultural institutions in Hamburg

References

This article incorporates information from the German Wikipedia.

Bibliography

in English
published in 17th–18th centuries
 
 
 

published in 19th century
 
 
 
 
 
 
 
 
 
 

published in 20th century
 
 
 
 
 
 
 
 
 

published in 21st century

in German
 
  v.2

External links

 Staats- und Universitätsbibliothek Hamburg. Maps of Hamburg
 Europeana. Items related to Hamburg, various dates.
 Digital Public Library of America. Items related to Hamburg, various dates
 New York Public Library. Items related to Hamburg

Years in Germany
 
Hamburg
Hamburg-related lists